Peter Anich (1723–1766) was an Austrian cartographer and maker of mathematical instruments.

His works, particularly the 1772, published Atlas Tyrolensis, are among the most accurate maps of their time.

References

1723 births
1766 deaths
Austrian cartographers